Claudia Nicole Cagnina Berenguel (born 10 September 1997) is a US-born Peruvian footballer who plays as a midfielder for Swedish club Sandvikens IF. She has been a member of the Peru women's national team. She also holds Italian citizenship.

Cagnina's mother was born and raised in Peru, while her paternal grandparents were born in Rome, Italy and moved to New York.

References

External links

1997 births
Living people
Citizens of Peru through descent
Peruvian women's footballers
Women's association football midfielders
Keflavík women's football players
FF Lugano 1976 players
Zaragoza CFF players
Swiss Women's Super League players
Segunda Federación (women) players
Peru women's international footballers
Peruvian people of Italian descent
Peruvian expatriate footballers
Peruvian expatriate sportspeople in Switzerland
Expatriate women's footballers in Switzerland
Peruvian expatriates in Iceland
Expatriate women's footballers in Iceland
Peruvian expatriate sportspeople in Spain
Expatriate women's footballers in Spain
Peruvian expatriate sportspeople in Sweden
Expatriate women's footballers in Sweden

People from Valley Stream, New York
Sportspeople from Nassau County, New York

People from Lindenhurst, New York
Sportspeople from Suffolk County, New York
Soccer players from New York (state)
American women's soccer players
St. John's Red Storm women's soccer players
American people of Italian descent
American sportspeople of Peruvian descent
American expatriate women's soccer players
American expatriate sportspeople in Switzerland
American expatriate sportspeople in Iceland
American expatriate sportspeople in Spain
American expatriate sportspeople in Sweden
Citizens of Italy through descent